"Love Will Keep Us Together" is a song written by Neil Sedaka and Howard Greenfield. It was first recorded by Sedaka in 1973. American pop duo Captain & Tennille covered the song in 1975, with instrumental backing almost entirely by “Captain” Daryl Dragon, with the exception of drums played by Hal Blaine; their version became a worldwide hit.

Composition
Sedaka admitted lifting the main chord progression from "Do It Again" by The Beach Boys and added a progression including augmented chords inspired by Al Green. The melody was written with Diana Ross in mind. Greenfield wrote the lyrics as one of the two final collaborations with Sedaka (they had decided reluctantly to break off their partnership because their songs were no longer commercially viable) along with "Our Last Song Together," before Greenfield moved to Los Angeles with his companion Tory Damon.

Neil Sedaka version
"Love Will Keep Us Together" first appeared on Neil Sedaka's 1973 studio album The Tra-La Days Are Over which did not have a US release. His version of the song made its US album debut on the 1974 compilation album Sedaka's Back.  In West Germany, Sedaka's original song was also included as the B-side of his 1976 hit, "Love in the Shadows".

In 2009, Neil Sedaka rerecorded a spoof of his song, renaming it "Lunch Will Keep Us Together" for his first children's CD Waking Up Is Hard to Do.

Mac and Katie Kissoon version
"Love Will Keep Us Together" had its first single release via a UK recording by the brother and sister vocal duo Mac and Katie Kissoon on September 28, 1973, but it failed to chart. This version also failed to chart in its US release in February 1974, but it did become the first hit version of "Love Will Keep Us Together" by virtue of charting in the Netherlands in the autumn of 1973, peaking at number 12 that December.

Captain & Tennille version
"Love Will Keep Us Together" was the title cut and lead single of Captain & Tennille's debut album, although "Captain" Daryl Dragon originally hoped that honor would go to the duo's rendition of "I Write the Songs". The single rose to number 1 on both the Billboard Easy Listening chart and the Billboard pop chart, staying atop the latter for four weeks starting June 21, 1975. It also hit the top of the 1975 year-end chart. In the US it was the best-selling single of 1975. "Love Will Keep Us Together" was certified gold by the RIAA and also won the Grammy Award (1975) for Record of the Year on February 28, 1976.

Record World said the song "is a solid choice of material for the label to propel this duo into Carpenter-ish acceptance."

Dragon and Tennille acknowledged Sedaka's authorship—as well as his mid-1970s comeback—by working the phrase "Sedaka is back" into the song's fadeout, where the applause from the studio musicians can be heard. Their version would earn Sedaka and Greenfield a Grammy nomination for Song of the Year. Twenty years later in 1995, the duo would re-record the song for their Twenty Years of Romance CD.

"Por Amor Viviremos" (Spanish version)
While "Love Will Keep Us Together" was topping the charts in the summer of 1975, Captain & Tennille released a Spanish version of the song, "Por Amor Viviremos". "Por Amor Viviremos" rose to number 49 on the Billboard Hot 100 chart, giving Captain & Tennille a rare feat of the identical song, in different languages and released as separate singles (rather than the A-side and B-side of one single), appearing simultaneously on the Billboard Hot 100. Chicago radio station WLS AM 890 used the two versions to create a Spanglish version of the song for their own broadcasting use.

"Por Amor Viviremos" would later appear on their May 1976 album Por Amor Viviremos, a Spanish track-for-track rerecording of their album Love Will Keep Us Together. It also appears on the 2002 Hip-O Records compilation album Ultimate Collection: The Complete Hits.

Personnel
Daryl Dragon – keyboards, bass, arrangements
Hal Blaine – drums, congas, percussion
Toni Tennille – Lead and backing vocals

Chart performance

Weekly charts

Year-end charts

All-time charts

Other notable versions
 Wilson Pickett recorded "Love Will Keep Us Together" for his 1976 studio album release Chocolate Mountain from which it was issued as a single. It reached number 69 on the Billboard R&B chart.
 In 1978 the song was covered by Timothy Dalton and Mae West in West's final movie Sextette
 In 1980 Joy Division released "Love Will Tear Us Apart", the title of which "was intended as an ironic nod to the classic '70s pop song."
 In 1992, Mexican trio Pandora released a cover version titled "Pierdo el Control" on their album Ilegal.
 In 1979 Ginger Rogers sang this song on The Love Boat in the episode "Critical Success / The Love Lamp Is Lit / Take My Boyfriend, Please / Rent a Family / The Man in Her Life: Parts 1 & 2"
 In 2001, the film Get Over It featured a dance to this song at the beginning by some of the cast.

References

1973 songs
1975 debut singles
Songs written by Neil Sedaka
Songs with lyrics by Howard Greenfield
Neil Sedaka songs
Captain & Tennille songs
Andy Williams songs
Number-one singles in Australia
Billboard Hot 100 number-one singles
Cashbox number-one singles
RPM Top Singles number-one singles
Grammy Award for Record of the Year
A&M Records singles
Juno Award for Best Selling Single singles